The 2009 Atlantic 10 men's basketball tournament was played at Boardwalk Hall in Atlantic City, New Jersey from March 11 through March 14, 2009.  The winner of the tournament received an automatic bid to the 2009 NCAA Men's Division I Basketball Tournament and was crowned Atlantic 10 Conference champion. Temple won the tournament with a 69–64 victory over Duquesne.

Bracket

Asterisk denotes game ended in overtime.

References

Atlantic 10 men's basketball tournament
Tournament
Atlantic 10 men's basketball tournament
Atlantic 10 men's basketball tournament